Moose River is a community in the Canadian province of Nova Scotia, located in  Pictou County.

References
Moose River on Destination Nova Scotia

Communities in Pictou County
General Service Areas in Nova Scotia